The following is a timeline of the history of the city of Hartford, Connecticut, USA.

Prior to 19th century
 1623 – Fort Hoop built by Dutch West India Company.
 1635 – English settlers arrive.
 1636 – First Church congregation relocates to "Newtown", Connecticut, from New Town, Massachusetts.
 1637 
 Settlement renamed Hartford.
 Town square laid out.
 1638 – Latin school founded.
 1640 – Burying Ground established (approximate date).
 1647 – Alse Young hanged for witchcraft.
 1662 – Hartford serving as capital of Connecticut Colony.
 1670 – Indian treaty signed.
 1701 – Hartford and New Haven designated joint capitals of Connecticut Colony.
 1720 - “Hartford Hills” separate to form the town of Bolton.
 1758 - Noah Webster born here, publisher of Grammatical Institute of the English Language
 1764 – Connecticut Courant newspaper begins publication.
 1774 – Library Company formed.
 1775 – 4th Connecticut Regiment organized.
 1783 – Town of East Hartford separates from Hartford.
 1784 
 City chartered.
 American Mercury newspaper begins publication.
 1788 – Woollen mill in operation.
 1790 – Population: 2,683.
 1792 – Hartford Bank incorporated.
 1796
 American Cookery published.
 State House built.
 1797 – Joseph Steward's museum opens.

19th century
 1810 – Hartford Fire Insurance Company incorporated.
 1812 – Chauncey Goodrich elected mayor.
 1814 
 Hartford Convention.
 Phoenix Bank incorporated.
 1818 
 Bridge over Connecticut River built.
 American Asylum for Deaf-mutes incorporated.
 1819 – Aetna Insurance Company and Society for Savings incorporated.
 1820 – Population: 4,726.
 1823 
 Washington College founded.
 Hartford Female Seminary established.
 Connecticut River Steamboat Co. incorporated.
 1824 
 Nathaniel Terry becomes mayor.
 Connecticut Retreat for the Insane opens.
 1825 
 Connecticut Historical Society established.
 Times & Hartford Advertiser newspaper begins publication.
 Connecticut River Banking Co. and Protection Insurance Co. incorporated.
 1826 
 The Hartford Times newspaper begins publication.
 African Religious Society church built on Talcott Street.
 1827 – Christ Church Cathedral built.
 1830 – Population: 7,074.
 1833 
 Miss Draper's Seminary for Young Ladies in operation (approximate date).
 Hartford Literary and Religious Institution and Colored Methodist Episcopal congregation formed.
 Farmers & Mechanics Bank incorporated.
 1834 – Exchange Bank incorporated.
 1835 – Patriot and Democrat newspaper begins publication.
 1836 
 Firemen's Benevolent Society organized.
 Northern Courier newspaper begins publication.
 1837 – Daily Courant newspaper begins publication.
 1838 – Hartford Young Men's Institute formed.
 1840
 Hartford Times newspaper begins publication.
 Population: 9,468.
 1841 – Washington Temperance Society, Martha Washington Temperance Society, and Young Men's Temperance Society organized.
 1843 – Hartford Journal newspaper begins publication.
 1844 
 Hartford and New Haven Railroad and Hartford and Springfield Railroad begin operating.
 Wadsworth Atheneum opens.
 1847 – I. & G. Fox Co. established.
 1848 – Colt's Patent Firearms Manufacturing Company founded.
 1849 – The Republican newspaper begins publication.
 1850 – Population: 13,555.
 1853 – Aetna Life Insurance Company incorporated.
 1854 
 Henry C. Deming becomes mayor.
 West Hartford municipality splits from Hartford.
 Connecticut State Library and Hartford Hospital established.
 1856 
 City rechartered.
 Charter Oak felled in storm.
 Hartford Evening Press newspaper begins publication.
 Armsmear built for Samuel Colt.
 1858 – Hartford Daily Post newspaper begins publication.
 1860 
 Boys' Club founded.
 Population: 26,917.
 Police department established.
 1864 – Travelers Insurance Company founded.
 1865 – Theological Institute of Connecticut relocates to Harford.
 1866 – Charles R. Chapman becomes mayor.
 1868 
 Bushnell Park laid out.
 Cedar Hill Cemetery consecrated.
 1869 – Travelers Journal newspaper begins publication.
 1872 
 New York, New Haven and Hartford Railroad and Ados Israel Synagogue founded.
 Windsor Avenue Congregational Church built (approximate date).
 1873 – Metropolitan African Methodist Episcopal Zion Church built.
 1874 – Mark Twain's house built on Farmington Avenue.
 1876 – Cheney Building constructed.
 1877 – Hartford Society for Decorative Art formed.
 1878 
 George G. Sumner elected mayor.
 State Capitol building constructed.
 Pope Manufacturing Company in business, making Columbia Bicycles.
 1880 – Morgan Bulkeley becomes mayor.
 1881 – Watkinson School founded.
 1882 – Post Office and Custom House built.
 1883 
 Hartford Telegram newspaper begins publication.
 Hartford Electric Light Co. organized.
 1884 – The Wooden Nutmeg begins publication.
 1885 – Hartford Camera Club organized.
 1886 – Soldiers and Sailors Memorial Arch dedicated.
 1888 – Hartford Morning Record newspaper begins publication.
 1889 – Union Station built.
 1890 – Population: 53,230.
 1892 – Hartford Public Library opens.
 1896 – City consolidated.
 1897 – Elizabeth Park laid out (approximate date).
 1898 
 Pope Park laid out.
 La Salette Missionary college in operation.
 Sage-Allen building constructed.
 1899 – Corning Fountain in Bushnell Park dedicated.
 1900 - Population: 79,850.

20th century
 1901 – Underwood Typewriter Company factory in operation.
 1908 
 Bridge over Connecticut River rebuilt.
 Royal Typewriter Company manufactory in operation.
 Morgan art gallery built.
 1909 – Flood.
 1910 
 Connecticut State Library and Supreme Court Building constructed.
 Population: 98,915.
 1919 – Travelers Tower built.
 1920 – The Hartt School founded.
 1921 – University of Connecticut School of Law established.
 1925 – WTIC (AM) radio begins broadcasting.
 1930 – Horace Bushnell Memorial Hall opens.
 1931 – Society of the Descendants of the Founders of Hartford organized.
 1934
 February 7: Premiere of Thomson's opera Four Saints in Three Acts.
 Symphony Society of Greater Hartford formed.
 1935 – Thomas J. Spellacy elected mayor.
 1938 – Hurricane.
 1941 – Windsor Locks airfield active.
 1942 – Connecticut Opera formed.
 1944 
 Interstate 84 constructed.
 Circus fire.
 1945
 Hartford Collection of local history established at the public library.
 State governor's residence locates to Prospect Avenue in Hartford.
 1947 
 Edward N. Allen becomes mayor.
 Bradley International Airport established.
 Hillyer College established.
 1950 – Population: 177,397.
 1955 – Hartford Graduate School established by Rensselaer Polytechnic Institute.
 1957 – University of Hartford chartered.
 1962 – Cathedral of St. Joseph rebuilt.
 1963 
 Hartford Stage founded.
 Phoenix Life Insurance Company Building constructed.
 1964 – Constitution Plaza built.
 1967 – Greater Hartford Community College established.
 1968 – Harriet Beecher Stowe House museum opens.
 1970
 Racial unrest.
 Cinestudio founded.
 1974 
 Mark Twain House museum opens.
 Hartford Advocate begins publication.
 1975 
 Hartford Civic Center opens.
 Real Art Ways established.
 Valley Advocate and Hartford Inquirer newspapers begin publication.
 1976 – Connecticut Transit Hartford founded.
 1979 
 Hartford Whalers hockey team active.
 Charter Oak Cultural Center established.
 1980	
 Population: 136,392.
 City Place I built.
 1987
 Hartford Karma Thegsum Choling established.
 Carrie Saxon Perry elected mayor.
 Hartford News begins publication.
 1992 
 Capital Community College established.
 Connecticut Forum founded.
 1998 – City website online (approximate date).
 1999 – Hartford Magnet Trinity College Academy established.

21st century
 2001 – Eddie Perez elected mayor.
 2004 – University High School of Science and Engineering established.
 2005 – Connecticut Convention Center opens.
 2008 – Global Communications Academy opens.
 2009 – Connecticut Science Center opens.
 2010 
 Population: 124,775.
 Pedro Segarra becomes mayor.
 2011 – Hurricane Irene.
 2016 – Hartford Connecticut Temple of The Church of Jesus-Christ of Latter-day Saints dedicated in Farmington, Connecticut, a suburb. It is the second Latter-day Saint temple dedicated in New England.

See also
 History of Hartford, Connecticut
 National Register of Historic Places listings in Hartford, Connecticut

References

Bibliography

published in the 19th century
 
 
 
 
 
 
 
 

published in the 20th century
 
 
 
 . + Chronology
 
  (fulltext via Open Library)

published in the 21st century

External links

 Connecticut History Online. Items related to Hartford.
 http://www.courant.com/sports/hockey/hartford-whalers/hc-whalers-historical-timeline,0,5898691.story
 Items related to Hartford, various dates (via Digital Public Library of America).

 
Hartford
hartford
Years in Connecticut